Operation Sabre was a Royal Navy military operation in World War II. It involved cutting the Japanese submarine communications cable linking Saigon and Singapore. operating from an X-Craft midget submarine in the Saigon River delta on 31 July 1945.

Operation Sabre was directed at the Hong Kong to Saigon telephone cable, and carried out by XE4 , which was towed to within  of the Mekong Delta by the submarine HMS Spearhead. Steered by Vernon Ginger Coles XE4 looked for the two telephone cables by using a towed grapnel. XE4's diver, Sub-Lieutenant K.M. Briggs, used the net/cable cutter to sever it. The second cable was soon found as well, and was severed by the second diver, Sub-Lieutenant A. Bergius. XE4 and Spearhead returned to Labuan on 3 August 1945.

Lieutenant Maxwell H. Shean, DSO and bar, Royal Australian Naval Volunteer Reserve, was awarded the American Bronze Star Medal in March 1947 for meritorious achievement as the commanding officer of the midget submarine HMS XE4.

References

Further reading

 

Sabre
1945 in Vietnam
Sabre
South West Pacific theatre of World War II